Epsilon Crateris (ε Crateris) is a solitary star in the southern constellation of Crater. Visible to the naked eye, it has an apparent visual magnitude of 4.84. It is located in the sky above Beta Crateris, and slightly to the left, or east, marking the lower right edge of the rim of the bowl and is somewhat closer to Theta Crateris, which is further east at the top of the bowl. With an annual parallax shift of 8.67 mas as seen from the Earth, its estimated distance is around 376 light years from the Sun.

This is an evolved K-type giant star with a stellar classification of K5 III. It has about the same mass as the Sun, but has expanded to 44.7 times the Sun's radius. The star is radiating 391 times the solar luminosity from its outer atmosphere at an effective temperature of 3,930 K.

References

K-type giants
Crater (constellation)
Crateris, Epsilon
Crateris, 14
Durchmusterung objects
099167
055687
4402